Emigrants Mountain is a summit in Jasper National Park in Alberta, Canada. accessible by walking track and with views over the Miette Valley, Mount Fitzwilliam and other peaks in the Great Divide.  Emigrants Mountain was so named on account of gold prospectors in the area.

References

Two-thousanders of Alberta
Alberta's Rockies